A Summer at Grandpa's is a 1984 Taiwanese coming-of-age family drama directed by Hou Hsiao-hsien and co-written with Hou by Chu Tʽien-wen. The film tells the semi-autobiographical exploits of a young brother and sister who spend a pivotal summer in the country with their grandparents while their mother is in critical care in the hospital.

The film was Hou's sixth overall, and first after his international breakthrough The Boys from Fengkuei (1983).

A Summer at Grandpa's was well received by critics in Taiwan and on the American and European festival circuits, winning the Jury Prize at the Locarno Film Festival in 1985 and the Golden Montgolfier at the 1985 Nantes Three Continents Film Festival.

Plot
A young boy, Dong-Dong and his sister spend a summer vacation at their grandparents' house in the country while their mother recuperates from an illness; they while away the hours climbing trees, swimming in a stream, searching for missing cattle, and coming uneasily to grips with the enigmatic and sometimes threatening realities of adult life.

Reception
The Chicago Reader gave the film a positive review, calling the film a "lyrical childhood remembrance" and praising the "fine, unsentimental attention to childhood incident".

The Japanese filmmaker Akira Kurosawa cited A Summer at Grandpa's as one of his 100 favorite films.

References

External links
 
 

1980s Mandarin-language films
1984 films
1984 drama films
Films directed by Hou Hsiao-hsien
Films with screenplays by Chu T’ien-wen
Taiwanese drama films